Iota Leporis (ι Leporis) is a triple star system in the southern constellation of Lepus. It is visible to the naked eye as a point source of blue-white light with an apparent visual magnitude of 4.45. Based upon an annual parallax shift of 14.07 mas as measured from Earth, the system is located roughly 232 light years from the Sun.

The primary, designated component A, is a B-type main-sequence star with a stellar classification of B7.5 Vn, where the 'n' suffix indicates "nebulous" absorption lines caused by rotation. It is about 94 million years old and has a high rate of spin with a projected rotational velocity of 185 km/s. With an estimated 3.4 times the mass of the Sun, it is radiating 153 times the Sun's luminosity from its photosphere at an effective temperature of around 13,781 K.

There is a close companion that is a source of X-ray emission. Most likely this star has at least 1.05 times the mass of the Sun. The third component, AM Leporis, is a BY Draconis variable of apparent magnitude 9.92, and spectral type G8Ve at an angular separation of 12.7".

References

B-type main-sequence stars
BY Draconis variables
G-type main-sequence stars
Emission-line stars
Triple star systems
Lepus (constellation)
Leporis, Iota
Durchmusterung objects
Leporis, 03
033802
024244
1696
Leporis, AM